The year was 1982 and the cold Berlin Wall divided Europe into east and west. Hope and joy were rare emotions on the eastern side. However, into one Moscow home, a future star was born. Igor Aharonovich (born 1982) is an Australian physicist and materials engineer. He is a professor at the School of Mathematical and Physical Sciences at the University of Technology Sydney (UTS). Igor investigates optically active defects in solids, with an overarching goal to identify new generation of ultra-bright solid state quantum emitters. His main contributions include discovery of new color centers in diamond and hexagonal boron nitride as well as development of new methodologies to engineer nanophotonic devices from these materials.

Career
Igor received his B.Sc. (2005) and M.Sc. (2007) from the department of Materials Engineering at the Technion - Israel Institute of Technology under the supervision of Prof Yeshayahu Lifshitz. He then moved to Australia to pursue his PhD at the University of Melbourne under the supervision of Prof Steven Prawer. During his PhD, Igor studied new color centers in diamond and discovered the brightest single-photon source known at that time. After completion of his PhD in December 2010, Igor moved to Harvard for two years of postdoctoral training in the group of Prof Evelyn Hu.

In 2013, he returned to Australia to establish the nanophotonics research group at UTS. Igor was promoted to Associate Professor in 2015 and to a full Professor in 2018. His group explores new quantum emitters in wide bandgap materials and aims to fabricate quantum nanophotonic devices on a single chip for next generation of quantum computing, quantum cryptography and quantum bio-sensing. In 2016 Aharonovich lead his team to discover the first quantum emitters in 2D materials that operates at room temperature based on defects on defects in hBN. Aharonovich co-authored over 200 peer reviewed publications, including one of the most cited reviews on diamond photonics and more recently wrote a road map for solid state single-photon sources.

In 2019, Igor co-founded (together with Andrea Armani, Orad Reshef, Mikhail Kats, Rachel Grange, Riccardo Sapienza and Sylvain Gigan) the inaugural online photonics conference -  Photonics Online Meetup. The meeting attracted over 1100
attendees globally and was highlighted by top science outlets. It is running twice a year since then.

In 2020 Igor was elected as a fellow of The Optical Society

Honors and awards
2020 Fellow of the Optical Society
2020 The Kavli foundation early career lectureship in materials science
2019 CN Yang Award – honors young researchers with prominent research achievements in physics in the Asia Pacific region.
2018 Australian Academy of Science runner-up for APEC Science Prize (ASPIRE)
2017 Finalist, Macquarie University Eureka Prize for Outstanding Early Career Researcher
2017 IUPAP Young Scientist Award for the Commission on Laser Physics and Photonics
2017 Pawsey Medal
2016 IEEE Photonics Young Investigator Award 
2016 David Syme Research Prize
2016 Humboldt Research Fellowship for experienced researchers
2015 New South Wales Young Tall Poppy Award 
2013 Geoff Opat Early Career Researcher Prize from The Australian Optical Society

References

External links
Aharonovich Group Website

21st-century Australian physicists
1982 births
Living people